Matthew Chamberlain (born April 17, 1967) is an American session musician, drummer, producer and songwriter. He has played with various artists, including Pearl Jam, David Bowie, The Wallflowers, Elton John, Brandi Carlile, Garbage, and Macy Gray.

Biography
Chamberlain was born in San Pedro, California on April 17, 1967. He began learning how to play the drums at 15 years old, taking lessons with David Garibaldi from the band Tower of Power. He attended North Texas State's music program, leaving after less than a year. After leaving college, he moved to Dallas, Texas and played with multiple bands, often taking on small gigs.

While in Texas, he was hired to play drums on tour with Edie Brickell & New Bohemians, and he recorded two records with the band before they broke up in 1991. At the time of hiring, Chamberlain was living next door to their bass player, Brad Houser.

He was the second drummer of the band Pearl Jam and played with them for about three weeks in the summer of 1991. He was in their music video for their song "Alive."

During the 1991 and 1992 season, he was a drummer for the house band of Saturday Night Live.

Along with Skerik, Brad Houser and Mike Dillon, he co-created the jazz-fusion band Critters Buggin.

He has played with David Bowie, Elton John, Brandi Carlile, Fiona Apple, The Wallflowers, Macy Gray, Natalie Merchant, Tori Amos, Garbage and others.

In 2016, 2019 and 2021, he won Modern Drummer magazine's readers poll in the Studio Musician category. In 2014 he filled in for drummer Matt Cameron in Soundgarden. He played over 51 shows with them through South America, Europe and a co-headlining tour with Nine Inch Nails in the United States.

He was the Music Director for More Music @ The Moore Theatre Seattle, Washington, in 2019 and 2020.

Chamberlain joined Bob Dylan's Never Ending Tour in 2019 and played on his 2020 release Rough and Rowdy Ways. He was succeeded by Charley Drayton when Dylan resumed touring at the end of 2021.

Selected discography
 
as leader
 Matt Chamberlain (Web Of Mimicry, 2005)
 Company 23 (Independent, 2012)
 Comet B (Independent, 2016)

with Critters Buggin
 Guest (Loosegroove, 1994)
 Host (Loosegroove, 1997)
 Monkeypot Merganzer (Independent, 1997)
 Bumpa (Loosegroove, 1998)
 Amoeba (Loosegroove, 1998)
 Stampede (Ropeadope, 2004)
 Live in 95 at the OK Hotel - Seattle 1995 (Independent, 2009)
 Muti EP (Independent, 2014)

with Floratone (Bill Frisell, Tucker Martine & Lee Townsend)
 Floratone (Blue Note, 2007)
 Floratone II (Savoy Jazz, 2012)

with Sean Watkins & Matt Chamberlain Duo
 Sean Watkins & Matt Chamberlain (Self Released, 2020)

with Slow Music Project (Bill Rieflin, Robert Fripp, Peter Buck, Fred Chalenor, Hector Zazou, Matt Chamberlain)
Live El Rey Theater, May 13 2006 (DGM Live)
Live The Coach House, May 12 2006 (DGM Live)
Live Largo, May 11 2006 (DGM Live)
Live Great American Music Hall, May 9 2006 (DGM Live)
Live Showbox, May 6 2006 (DGM Live)
Live Aladdin Theater May 5 2006 (DGM Live)

with Painted Shield
 Painted Shield (Loosegroove, 2020)
 Painted Shield 2 (Loosegroove, 2022)

as a sideman

with Bob Dylan
 Rough and Rowdy Ways (Columbia, 2020)

with A Perfect Circle
 Eat the Elephant (BMG, 2018)

with Amos Lee
 My New Moon (Dualtone Music Group, Inc., 2018)

with Brandi Carlile
 The Story (Columbia, 2007)
 Bear Creek (Columbia, 2012)

with Perfume Genius
 Set My Heart on Fire Immediately (Matador Records, 2020)
 Eye In The Wall (Matador Records, 2020)

with Brad Mehldau
 Largo (Warner Bros, 2002)
 Highway Rider (Nonesuch Records, 2010)

with Bruce Springsteen
 Wrecking Ball (Columbia, 2012)
 Western Stars (Columbia, 2019)

with Jars of Clay
 Inland (Gray Matters, 2013)

with Shelby Lynne
 Love, Shelby (Island Records, 2001)

with Kanye West
 Late Registration (Uncredited) (Def Jam Roc-A-Fella, 2005)

with Leonard Cohen
 Thanks for the Dance (Columbia Records, 2019)

with Chris Cornell
 Higher Truth (UM, 2015)

with The Wallflowers
 Bringing Down the Horse (Interscope Records, 1996)
 Breach (Interscope, 2000)

with Chris Isaak
 Speak of the Devil (Reprise Records, 1998)

with Stevie Nicks
 Trouble in Shangri-La (Reprise Records, 2001)

with David Bowie
 Heathen (Columbia Records, 2002)
 Reality (Columbia Records, 2003)

with Edie Brickell and New Bohemians
 Ghost of a Dog (Geffen, 1990)

with Elton John
 Songs from the West Coast (Mercury Records, 2001)

with Fiona Apple
 Tidal (Columbia Records, 1996)
 When the Pawn... (Epic Records, 1999)

with Frank Ocean
 Channel Orange (Def Jam, 2012)

with John Mayer
 Heavier Things (Aware Columbia, 2003)

with Laura Marling
 Semper Femina (More Alarming Records, 2017)

with Mac Miller
 Circles (Warner, 2020)

with Macy Gray
 On How Life Is (Epic Records, 1999)

with Of Montreal
 False Priest (Polyvinyl, 2010)
 The Controllersphere (Polyvinyl, 2011)

with Phantogram
 Voices (Republic, 2014)
 Three (Republic, 2016)

with Peter Gabriel
 Flotsam and Jetsam (Real World, Virgin EMI, Republic, 2019)

with Randy Newman
 Dark Matter (Nonesuch, 2017)

with Robbie Williams
 Intensive Care (Chrysalis Records, 2005)

with Sara Bareilles
 Little Voice (Epic, 2007)
 Kaleidoscope Heart (Epic, 2010)

with Sam Phillips
 Omnipop (It's Only a Flesh Wound Lambchop) (Virgin Records, 1996)

with Rufus Wainwright
 Unfollow the Rules (BMG, 2020)

with Sean Lennon
 Friendly Fire (Parlophone, Capitol, EMI, 2006)

with Tori Amos
 From the Choirgirl Hotel (Atlantic, 1998)
 To Venus and Back (Atlantic, 1999)
 Strange Little Girls (Atlantic, 2001)
 Scarlet's Walk (Epic, 2002)
 The Beekeeper (Epic, 2005)
 American Doll Posse (Epic, 2007)
 Abnormally Attracted to Sin (Universal Republic, 2009)
 Midwinter Graces (Universal Republic, 2009)
  Christmastide (Universal Republic, 2020)
 Ocean To Ocean (Decca, 2021) https://en.wikipedia.org/wiki/Ocean_to_Ocean

with Willie Nelson and Miranda Lambert
 Restoration: Reimagining the Songs of Elton John and Bernie Taupin (Universal Nashville, 2018)

with The Who
 Who (Polydor, 2019)

with Lorde
 Solar Power (Universal Music New Zealand Limited, 2021)

with Amber Arcades
 Barefoot on Diamond Road (Fire Records, 2023)

Movie soundtracks
Trainwreck
Man of Steel
Frozen

References

External links

1967 births
Living people
American rock drummers
American session musicians
Musicians from California
People from San Pedro, Los Angeles
20th-century American drummers
American male drummers
20th-century American male musicians
Pearl Jam members
Critters Buggin members
Saturday Night Live Band members
Edie Brickell & New Bohemians members